This is a list of hydroelectric power stations in Pakistan as per NEPRA Report 2021.

In service

Under construction

Proposed

See also
List of barrages and headworks in Pakistan

References

Pakistan
Water and Power Development Authority
Power stations, hydro
Hydroelectric power stations in Pakistan